The Woman Who Desires Sin  (Polish: Kobieta, która grzechu pragnie) is a 1929 Polish silent crime film directed by Wiktor Biegański and starring Carlotta Bologna, Tadeusz Wenden and Stefan Łada. It was less popular with critics than some of Bieganski's earlier films.

Cast
 Carlotta Bologna as Irena Parecka 
 Tadeusz Wenden as Ing. Janusz Stoma 
 Stefan Łada as Witold Tyński 
 Nora Ney as Maryna 
 Oktawian Kaczanowski as Tadeusz Parecki, Irena's father 
 Jerzy Jabłoński as Agent policyjny 
 Alma Kar as Wanda, Irena's friend 
 Alojzy Kłyko as Kuba 
 Wacław Korwin as Sędzia śledczy 
 Włodzimierz Metelski as Ryszard Zychoń

References

Bibliography
 Haltof, Marek. Polish National Cinema. Berghahn Books, 2002.

External links

1929 films
1929 crime films
Polish crime films
Polish silent films
1920s Polish-language films
Films directed by Wiktor Bieganski
Polish black-and-white films